Josephus Nicolaus Laurenti (4 December 1735, Vienna – 17 February 1805, Vienna) was an Austrian naturalist and zoologist of Italian origin.

This was an important book in herpetology, defining thirty genera of reptiles; Carl Linnaeus's 10th edition of Systema Naturae in 1758 defined only ten genera. Specimen Medicum contains a description of the blind salamander (amphibian): Proteus anguinus, purportedly collected from cave waters in Slovenia (or possibly western Croatia); this description represented one of the first published accounts of a cave animal in the western world, although Proteus anguinus was not recognized as a cave animal at the time.

External links 
 Specimen Medicum, Exhibens Synopsin Reptilium Emendatam cum Experimentis circa Venena at Göttinger Digitalisierungszentrum

1735 births
1805 deaths
18th-century Austrian scientists
18th-century Latin-language writers
18th-century male writers
Austrian zoologists
Austrian naturalists
Austrian herpetologists
Austrian people of Italian descent
Scientists from Vienna